The new Holmestrand Station is a railway station on the Vestfold Line located in the town of Holmestrand in Vestfold, Norway, that opened for traffic on 28 November 2016. It is located inside the tunnel Holmestrandsporten.

In October 2016, the old station named Holmestrand was closed to prepare for the opening of the new one. On 28 November 2016, the new Holmestrand station opened. This is placed inside the mountain Holmestrandfjellet. Creating the 130 000 cubic meters mountain hall was a six year undertaking for Jernbaneverket, along with partners like the architect and subconsultant Gottlieb Paludan Architects. Ramboll handled detailed planning, zoning plan, building plan and design.

Picture gallery

References

Railway stations in Holmestrand
Railway stations on the Vestfold Line
Railway stations opened in 2016
Railway stations located underground in Norway